Originating in the Caribbean with Indian roots, a roti is a wrap style sandwich filled with either curried or sometimes stewed meats or vegetables wrapped inside a dhalpuri, paratha, or dosti roti. Roti is eaten widely across the Caribbean. As Indo-Caribbeans immigrated to other countries, especially in North America and Europe, they brought with them the roti and opened roti shops to sell it.

See also

 Cuisine of Trinidad and Tobago
 List of sandwiches
 List of stuffed dishes
 Goat roti

References

Roti
Flatbread dishes
Sandwiches
Fast food
Trinidad and Tobago cuisine
Jamaican cuisine
Grenadian cuisine
Caribbean cuisine
Indo-Caribbean cuisine
Guyanese cuisine
Surinamese cuisine
Stuffed dishes